Carlo Alberto Quario (born 14 March 1913 in Vercelli; died 30 August 1984) was an Italian professional football player and coach.

External links

1913 births
1984 deaths
People from Vercelli
Italian footballers
Serie A players
F.C. Pavia players
A.C. Ancona players
F.C. Pro Vercelli 1892 players
S.S.C. Napoli players
Inter Milan players
Brescia Calcio players
Italian football managers
Parma Calcio 1913 managers
Cagliari Calcio managers
Venezia F.C. managers
Brescia Calcio managers
Atalanta B.C. managers
Association football forwards
A.S.D. La Biellese players
A.C. Monza managers
Footballers from Piedmont
Sportspeople from the Province of Vercelli